Dasht-e Murt-e Sofla (also Romanized as Dasht-e Mūrt-e Soflá) is a village in Qalkhani Rural District, Gahvareh District, Dalahu County, Kermanshah Province, Iran. At the 2006 census, its population was 305, in 57 families.

References 

Populated places in Dalahu County